FK Obilić Herceg Novi is a football club from the village Sutorina, Herceg Novi, Montenegro. They play in the Montenegrin Third League-South.

History
The club was founded in 2010 under former Obilić from Zelenika, which existed since 1924 to 1941.

External links
Official Website

Curiosity
In the season 2019/2020 the club had the first one not Balkan coach, Eugenio Sena (Italian), who has been part of First team staff. 

Football clubs in Montenegro
Association football clubs established in 1924
1924 establishments in Montenegro